Ischyropoda is a genus of mites in the family Haemogamasidae.

Species
 Ischyropoda spiniger Keegan, 1951

References

Mesostigmata